Ramakrishna Sarada Mission Sister Nivedita Girls' School or Sister Nivedita Girls' School is a girls' school at Bagbazar, North Kolkata. It was established by Scottish-Irish social worker, author, speaker and disciple of Swami Vivekananda, Sister Nivedita, in November 1898.

History

1898–1917 

Swami Vivekananda requested Sister Nivedita to come to India. Responding to his call, Sister Nivedita (at that time Margaret Elizabeth Noble) came to India in January 1898. The main reason why Swamiji invited her was to spread education to the women of the country. When Nivedita informed Vivekananda about her planning, he felt very excited. He organised a meeting at Balaram Bose's house on this issue. 

Many lay devotees of Sri Ramakrishna, including Mastermashay Mahendranath Gupta (Sri M., the chronicler of The Gospel of Sri Ramakrishna), Suresh Dutta, Haramohan etc. attended this meeting. Nivedita explained her plan and requested everyone to send their girls to the school. During her speech, Vivekananda entered the room and took seat behind everyone. Nivedita did not notice it. But, when Nivedita appealed to collect girls for the school, she suddenly discovered Vivekananda in the room pushing others and prompting "Ye, get up, get up! It’s not good enough to just become girls’ fathers. All of you must -cooperate in the matter of their education as per national ideals. Stand up and commit. Reply to her appeal. Say, 'We all agree. We shall send our girls to your school. " But no one stood up to support Nivedita's proposal.

Vivekananda forced Haramohan to agree to the proposal and behalf of Haramohan Vivekananda promised to send his girls to the school.

On 13 November 1898, on the day of Kali Puja, at 16 Bosepara Lane in the Bagbazar area of North Calcutta, she started the school. The school was inaugurated by Sarada Devi, in the presence of Swami Vivekananda and some of the other disciples of Ramakrishna. Sarada Devi blessed and prayed for the school saying "I pray that the blessings of the Divine Mother may be upon the school and the girls; and the girls trained from the school may become ideal girls."

1917–present 
In 1902, it became a regular school. In 1903, Sister Christine, an American disciple of Swami Vivekananda, joined Sister Nivedita in the work. After the death of Sister Nivedita in October 1911, the school faced many difficulties. In 1914, Sister Sudhira took entire responsibility of the school. Since then, it has been governed, maintained and nurtured by a group of self-sacrificing women.

Since 1918, the school was a branch centre of the Ramakrishna Mission. On 9 August 1963, it was transferred to Ramakrishna Sarada Mission, Dakshineswar and thus became a branch centre of that organization (i.e., Ramakrishna Sarada Mission; the school's present name is "Ramkrishna Sarada Mission Sister Nivedita Girls' School").

Infrastructure

School building 
School's old building is located at 5, Nivedita Lane, Kolkata – 700003 and the industrial building is located at 68A, Ramkanto Bose Street, Kolkata - 700003. In the old building there are 35 rooms and a prayer hall.

Sections 
There are three sections: primary, secondary and industrial.

 Primary section
The primary section has classes I to IV. A special committee following the Special Rules of the Education Department manages this section.

 Secondary section
The secondary section has classes V to X. It is affiliated to the West Bengal Board of Secondary Education. Its management body is constituted following that of the West Bengal education department.

 Industrial section
This department was started in 1903 by Sister Nivedita and Sister Christine. At that time it was named Pura-Stree Vibhaga. Here, students are taught for free. Handicrafts like embroidery,  tailoring, and toy-making are taught here. Students organise an exhibition of their work every year. This industrial section is affiliated to the Directorate of Cottage and Small Scale Industries, Government of West Bengal since 1949, and they receive grants from them.

Alumni association 
In 1998 the "Sister Nivedita Girls’ School Alumni Association" was founded for ex-students. Social, cultural and religious events are regularly organised by the alumni association.

See also 
 Baranagore Ramakrishna Mission Ashrama High School 
 Ramakrishna Mission Vidyalaya, Narendrapur
 Ramakrishna Mission Siksha Mandir
 Ramakrishna Sarada Math
 Sri Sarada Math

References

External links 
 
 Alumni association website

Schools affiliated with the Ramakrishna Mission
Sister Nivedita
Primary schools in West Bengal
High schools and secondary schools in West Bengal
Girls' schools in Kolkata
Educational institutions established in 1898
1898 establishments in India